Samuel Brookes  (born 26 October 1879) was a Welsh international footballer. He was part of the Wales national football team, playing 2 matches. He played his first match on 24 February 1900 against Ireland  and his last match on 26 March 1900 against England.

See also
 List of Wales international footballers (alphabetical)

References

External links
 

1879 births
1938 deaths
Welsh footballers
Wales international footballers
People from Llandudno
Sportspeople from Conwy County Borough
Association football midfielders
Llandudno Swifts F.C. players